Paul Newman (1925–2008) was an American actor.

Paul Newman may also refer to:
Paul Newman (politician) (born 1954), Arizona politician
Paul Newman (cricketer) (born 1959), English cricketer
Paul Newman (linguist) (born 1937), American linguist
Paul S. Newman (1924–1999), American comic book writer
Paul Newman (band), an Austin, Texas band
Paul Newman (engineer), British academic
Paul Newman (accountant), American accountant

See also
Paul Neumann (disambiguation)
Newman (disambiguation)

Newman, Paul